AFB Durban  is an airbase of the South African Air Force, located in Durban, KwaZulu-Natal, South Africa. The runway is shared with the (now defunct) Durban International Airport (since September 1956).  The airbase is at the northern end of the runway.

Status following closure of Durban International Airport
 no replacement site has been provided for 15 Squadron, which is still based at the airport. As a helicopter unit it does not require a large airfield with runways.

Aviation
 Non-directional beacon - DU393.0
 VHF omnidirectional range - DNV112.5
 Automatic Terminal Information Service - 127.0

It is home to 15 Squadron which currently operates Atlas Oryx and BK 117 helicopters. Their primary role is maritime and landward search and rescue. Two flights of Oryx are based in Durban and  C Flight, consisting of four BK 117s is detached to Port Elizabeth. C Flight's conversion to AgustaWestland AW109 helicopters has been postponed due to delays in developing emergency flotation equipment for the type, thus precluding its use in a maritime environment.

Units hosted
15 Squadron- Helicopters
508 Squadron
105 Squadron - Citizen Force liaison and crime prevention patrol squadron. Reserve squadron operating various civil light aircraft by mostly civilian pilots.

See also
 List of airports in the Durban area

References

External links
http://www.af.mil.za/bases/afb_durban/15sqn.htm 
http://www.af.mil.za/bases/afb_durban/508sqn.htm#a 
http://www.af.mil.za/bases/afb_durban/Default.htm
http://www.pictaero.com/en/airports/airport,za,fadn

Durban
Durban
Transport in Durban